Ruba Katrib is a Syrian-American curator of contemporary art. She has served as Curator and Director of Curatorial Affairs at MoMA PS1 since 2017. From 2012 until 2017, Katrib was Curator at SculptureCenter in New York. Prior to this post, she worked first as Assistant Curator and then as Associate Curator at the Museum of Contemporary Art in North Miami. She is best known for exhibitions highlighting women artists and global issues.

Early life and education 
Katrib was born in Baltimore, Maryland, and grew up in Charleston, West Virginia. She is the first US-born child of Syrian immigrant parents. 

Katrib holds degrees from the School of the Art Institute of Chicago and the Center for Curatorial Studies, Bard College. In 2002, while a student at the School of the Art Institute of Chicago, she co-founded ThreeWalls, a residency and exhibition space.

Career 
From 2007 until 2012, Katrib worked at the Museum of Contemporary Art (MOCA), North Miami as Assistant Curator before being named Associate Curator. Among the shows Katrib curated at MOCA were solo presentations by Cory Arcangel and Claire Fontaine (both 2010), and group exhibitions including The Possibility of an Island (2008) and Convention (2009). In 2011, she organized a symposium, “New Methods,” that looked at artist-run educational platforms in Latin America. Katrib was awarded a curatorial fellowship from the Andy Warhol Foundation for the Visual Arts in 2010 to support research for “New Methods”.

Katrib became Curator at SculptureCenter in New York in 2012. At SculptureCenter, she curated the group exhibitions 74 million million million tons (2018) (co-curated with Lawrence Abu-Hamdan), The Eccentrics (2015), Puddle, pothole, portal (2014) (co-curated with Camille Henrot), Better Homes (2013), and A Disagreeable Object (2012); and solo shows of the work of Carissa Rodriguez (2018), Kelly Akashi, Sam Anderson, Teresa Burga, Cercle d’Art des Travailleurs de Plantation Congolaise (CATPC), Nicola L., Charlotte Prodger (all 2017), Rochelle Goldberg, Aki Sasamoto, Cosima von Bonin (all 2016), Anthea Hamilton, Araya Rasdjarmrearnsook, Magali Reus, Gabriel Sierra, Michael E. Smith, Erika Verzutti (all 2015), David Douard, and Jumana Manna (both 2014). With Tom Eccles she co-curated Visitors, a group exhibition of public art on Governors Island, New York in 2015.

In 2017, Katrib was named Curator at MoMA PS1. At MoMA PS1 she has curated exhibitions such as Greater New York (2021), Niki de Saint Phalle: Structures for Life (2021), Theater of Operations: The Gulf Wars 1991 - 2011 (2019) (co-curated with Peter Eleey), the retrospective Simone Fattal: Works and Days (2019), and the solo shows of Edgar Heap of Birds (2019), Karrabing Collective (2019), Fernando Palma Rodríguez, and Julia Phillips (2018). In 2018, Katrib curated prominent group invitational exhibition SITE Santa Fe and was a curatorial advisor for the Carnegie International. In 2021, Katrib was promoted to Curator and Director of Curatorial Affairs at MoMA PS1 and curated MoMA PS1's Greater New York invitational group exhibition of artists based in New York. She has served on the graduate committee at CCS Bard since 2017.

Katrib has contributed texts for a number of museum catalogues and periodicals including Art in America, Artforum, Cura Magazine, Kaleidoscope, Parkett, and Mousse. Her work is often concerned with diasporic and marginalized discourses in 21st-century artistic practices and the art world generally.

List of Exhibitions

MoMA PS1, New York, 2017 – present

Group Exhibitions 

 Greater New York, 2021
 Theater of Operations: The Gulf Wars 1991 - 2011, co-curated with Peter Eleey, 2019

Monographic Exhibitions 

 Jumana Manna: Break, Take, Erase, Tally, 2022

 Niki de Saint Phalle: Structures for Life, 2021

 Simone Fattal: Works and Days, 2019

 Edgar Heap of Birds: Surviving Active Shooter Custer, 2019

 Julia Phillips: Failure Detection, 2018

 Fernando Palma Rodriguez: In Ixtli in Yollotl, We the People, 2018

SculptureCenter, New York, 2012 – 2017

Group Exhibitions 

 74 million million million tons, co-curated with Lawrence Abu-Hamdan, 2017

 The Eccentrics, 2015

 Puddle, pothole, portal, co-curated with Camille Henrot, 2014

 Better Homes, 2013 

 A Disagreeable Object, 2012

Monographic Exhibitions 

 Carissa Rodriguez: The Maid, 2018 
 Kelly Akashi: Long Exposure, 2017
 Sam Anderson: The Park, 2017
 Teresa Burga: Mano Mal Dibujada, 2017
 Cercle d’Art des Travailleurs de Plantation Congolaise (CATPC), 2017
 Nicola L.: Works, 1968 to the Present, 2017
 Charlotte Prodger: Subtotal, 2017
 Rochelle Goldberg: The Plastic Thirsty, 2016
 Aki Sasamoto: Delicate Cycle, 2016
 Cosima von Bonin: Who's Exploiting Who in the Deep Sea?, 2016 
 Anthea Hamilton: Cigarette Pipes, 2015
 Araya Rasdjarmrearnsook, 2015
 Magali Reus: Spring for a Ground, 2015
 Gabriel Sierra: Numbers in a Room, 2015
 Michael E. Smith: -, 2015 
 Erika Verzutti: Swan with Stage, 2015 
 David Douard)juicy o'f the nest., 2014
 Jumana Manna: Menace of Origins, 2014

Museum of Contemporary Art, North Miami, 2007 – 2012

Group Exhibitions 

 The Reach of Realism, 2010
 Convention, 2009
 The Possibility of an Island, 2008
 Dark Continents, 2008

Monographic Exhibitions 

 Cory Arcangel: The Sharper Image, 2010
 Claire Fontaine: Economies, 2010

Select Publications 

 “Bettina: Photographs and Works by Bettina Grossman.” Aperture, 2022.
 “Erika Verzutti: The Indiscipline of Sculpture.” KMEC Books/MASP, 2022. 
 Niki de Saint Phalle: Structures for Life. MoMA PS1, 2021. 
 “Neïl Beloufa: People Love War Data & Travels.” After 8 Books, 2021
 “Leidy Churchman: Crocodile.” Dancing Foxes, Hessel Museum, Bard College, 2019.
 “Molecular Sculpture.” Art in America, 2017. 
 “New Methods.” Museum of Contemporary Art North Miami, 2013.

References 

Year of birth missing (living people)
Living people
People from Charleston, West Virginia
American women curators
American curators